The Chief Development Officer is an administrative post in the Indian states of Uttar Pradesh and Uttarakhand and Bihar tasked to oversee various developmental schemes of poverty alleviation and infrastructure creation of the state and central governments. The officer works under the overall supervision and control of the District Magistrate.

See also 
 National Rural Livelihood Mission
 Pradhan Mantri Gramin Awaas Yojana
 Mahatma Gandhi National Rural Employment Guarantee Act (MNREGA)
 Members of Parliament Local Area Development Scheme (MPLADS)

References 

Indian government officials
Civil Services of India